Mladen Košćak (16 October 1936 – 3 August 1997) was a Croatian footballer.

Club career
Born in Zagreb, Košćak joined the youth academy of local side Dinamo Zagreb, with whom he spent his entire career. He started playing at full professional level in the 1955–56 season. Košćak soon established himself as a first-team regular and was instrumental in Dinamo's 1957–58 Yugoslav First League title. Although he was considered a huge talent, his career was hampered by a serious injury and he effectively stopped playing by 1960, appearing in only a single match in his last three years with the club before retiring in 1963.

International career
Internationally, he was capped 4 times for the Yugoslavia national football team and was member of the national squad which won the silver medal at the 1956 Summer Olympics in Melbourne. His final international was a December 1956 friendly match away against Indonesia.

References

External links
 

Mladen Koščak at Reprezentacija.rs 

1936 births
1997 deaths
Footballers from Zagreb
Association football defenders
Yugoslav footballers
Yugoslavia international footballers
Footballers at the 1956 Summer Olympics
Olympic footballers of Yugoslavia
Olympic silver medalists for Yugoslavia
Olympic medalists in football
Medalists at the 1956 Summer Olympics
GNK Dinamo Zagreb players
Yugoslav First League players